Fine Creek Mills is an unincorporated community in Powhatan County, in the U.S. state of Virginia.

The Fine Creek Mills Historic District and St. Luke's Episcopal Church are listed on the National Register of Historic Places.

Climate
Climate is characterized by relatively high temperatures and evenly distributed precipitation throughout the year.  The Köppen Climate Classification subtype for this climate is "Cfa". (Humid Subtropical Climate).

External links

References

Unincorporated communities in Virginia
Unincorporated communities in Powhatan County, Virginia